Spirit Rock Meditation Center, commonly called Spirit Rock, is a meditation center in Woodacre, California.  It focuses on the  teachings of the Buddha as presented in the vipassana, or Insight Meditation, tradition. It was founded in 1985 as Insight Meditation West, and is visited by an estimated 40,000 people a year.  The San Francisco Chronicle has called it one of "the Bay Area's best-known centers for Buddhist meditation."

History 

In 1975 the Insight Meditation Society (IMS) was founded in Barre, Massachusetts, by a group of Western meditation teachers trained in Asia, including Jack Kornfield, Joseph Goldstein, James Baraz and Sharon Salzberg. In 1986, after ten years at IMS, Kornfield moved to Northern California with his family and began hosting a Monday night meditation class in a private home in San Anselmo. Eventually the class expanded to a clinic and then to a local church. In 1985 a group of meditation students and teachers in the San Francisco Bay Area incorporated as Insight Meditation West, for the purpose of acquiring land and establishing a west coast Insight Meditation center.  The group included Kornfield, James Baraz, Sylvia Boorstein, and Anna Douglas .  The incorporator and first board president was Lloyd Burton, who later founded the Insight Meditation Community of Denver.

In 1988, with funds from an anonymous donation, 412 acres of undeveloped land in the San Geronimo Valley, an hour north of San Francisco, was purchased from The Nature Conservancy in order to start a permanent meditation center, and the name Spirit Rock Meditation Center was formally adopted.  In 1990 temporary construction trailers were erected to house the community meditation hall, administrative offices and caretaker residences. Construction for permanent replacement facilities began in 2014. and in 2016, a new Community Meditation Center, staff village and administrative buildings were completed.

The residential retreat center opened in July 1998. The majority of the center’s land is protected by an open space easement and kept in conservation.

Teachings 

The teachings at Spirit Rock focus on the practice of vipassanā as taught in the Theravada tradition. Teachings focus on training and quieting the mind, on the teachings of Gautama Buddha as found in Buddhist texts, and on incorporating the Dharma into daily life. Retreats are modeled on those held for lay people in the Thai Forest Tradition, including sitting and walking meditation, meetings with the teachers and the observation of silence by practitioners.

In addition to vipassana teachings, Spirit Rock hosts teachers from Zen, Tibetan and nondual traditions as guest teachers throughout the year. Visiting teachers have included the 14th Dalai Lama, Thích Nhất Hạnh, Preah Maha Ghosananda,  Anagarika Munindra, Kalu Rinpoche, Ram Dass, Pema Chödrön, Tsoknyi Rinpoche, Huston Smith, Adyashanti, Tara Brach, Alice Walker, Zoketsu Norman Fischer and others.

Programs 

A portion of the classes, daylongs and retreats at Spirit Rock are organized as community-specific programs to promote diversity. These programs are referred to as Kindred Sangha and include self-identified people of color, women, LGBTQIA+ community, families, young adults, and elders. Class offerings also address the application of Buddhist teachings to modern issues such as addiction and trauma. Spirit Rock offers scholarships to make classes and retreats available to those who cannot otherwise afford them.

Organization 

The center is supported by fees charged for classes and retreats, and by donations. The paid staff runs the day-to-day operations of Spirit Rock Meditation Center with support from volunteers.  Residential retreat managers are volunteers who rely on voluntary dāna (donations) from participants to support their work. Teachers on residential retreats are supported by donations from the students, as is the practice in the Buddhist tradition. but on non-residential retreats, daylong retreats, events and classes teachers are supported by fees paid by attendees to Spirit Rock.

Spirit Rock’s teaching programs are developed by the Teachers Council, a collective of teachers. A volunteer Board of Directors, composed of teachers and community members, is the central decision-making body for Spirit Rock. The work of the Board is supported by a number of committees.

Current Spirit Rock teachers include Ajahn Amaro, Ayya Anandabodhi; Sally Armstrong; Guy Armstrong; James Baraz; Sylvia Boorstein; Eugene Cash; Debra Chamberlin-Taylor; Howard Cohn; Mark Coleman; Dana DePalma; Anna Douglas; Andrea Fella; Anushka Fernandopulle; Gil Fronsdal; Robert Hall; Will Kabat-Zinn; Jack Kornfield; Phillip Moffitt; Wes Nisker; Mary Grace Orr; Sharda Rogell; Donald Rothberg; Tempel Smith; John Travis; Spring Washam; Julie Wester; Diana Winston; and Larry Yang.  Spirit Rock trained a new group of teachers who graduated in September 2020 including: Alisa Dennis, Amana Bremby Johnson, Cara Lai Fitz Gibbon, Carol Cano, Dawn Mauricio, Gulwinder Singh, James Lowe, JD Doyle, Jeff Haozous, Kaira Lingo, Kate Johnson, Katy Wiss, Konda Mason, Leslie Booker, Louije Kim, Noliwe Alexander, Pawan Bareja, Rachel Lewis, Solwazi Johnson, Teresa Abdala-Romano and Victoria Cary.

Collaborations 

A number of Spirit Rock teachers also offer their teachings, or serve on the Board of Directors, at other meditation centers including East Bay Meditation Center in Oakland, California,   the Modesto Almond Blossom Sangha in Modesto, California, Insight Meditation Society in Barre, Massachusetts,  Insight Meditation Center in Redwood City, California, Mountain Stream Meditation Center in Nevada City, California, and Aloka Vihara, a forest monastery of bikkhunis (fully ordained nuns) in the Sierra Foothills of California.

Further reading 

Gil Fronsdal, "Insight Meditation in the United States: Life, Liberty, and the Pursuit of Happiness" from Charles S. Prebish and Kenneth K. Tanaka, "The Faces of Buddhism in America", Chapter 9, Copyright 1998, The Regents of the University of California, 
Walt Opie, Tending the Garden of the Dharma for 25 Years: An Interview with Jack Kornfield in Spirit Rock News & Schedule of Events, January - April 2013, p3-5,

References

External links 
 

Buddhist meditation
Spiritual retreats
1987 establishments in California
Buildings and structures in Marin County, California
Organizations based in Marin County, California